Belchin Rock (‘Skala Belchin’ ska-'la bel-'chin) is a rock off the north coast of Livingston Island in the South Shetland Islands, Antarctica situated in Hero Bay  northeast of Siddins Point and  north of Melta Point.

The rock is named after the settlement of Belchin in western Bulgaria.

Location
Bulgarian mapping in 2009 and 2010.

See also 
 Composite Gazetteer of Antarctica
 List of Antarctic islands south of 60° S
 Scientific Committee on Antarctic Research
 Territorial claims in Antarctica

Map
 L.L. Ivanov. Antarctica: Livingston Island and Greenwich, Robert, Snow and Smith Islands. Scale 1:120000 topographic map.  Troyan: Manfred Wörner Foundation, 2009.

Notes

References
 Belchin Rock. SCAR Composite Antarctic Gazetteer
 Bulgarian Antarctic Gazetteer. Antarctic Place-names Commission. (details in Bulgarian, basic data in English)

External links
 Belchin Rock. Copernix satellite image

Rock formations of Livingston Island
Bulgaria and the Antarctic